Lamjed Chehoudi (born 8 May 1986 in Dubai) is an Emirati-born Tunisian footballer who plays as a forward .

Career statistics

International goals
Scores and results list Tunisia's goal tally first.

References

External links

1986 births
Living people
Tunisian footballers
Tunisia international footballers
Dubai CSC players
Al-Sailiya SC players
CA Bizertin players
Étoile Sportive du Sahel players
Espérance Sportive de Tunis players
Stade Tunisien players
FC Lokomotiv 1929 Sofia players
First Professional Football League (Bulgaria) players
Saudi Professional League players
Al-Fateh SC players
Expatriate footballers in Switzerland
Expatriate footballers in Bahrain
Expatriate footballers in the United Arab Emirates
Expatriate footballers in Qatar
Expatriate footballers in Bulgaria
Expatriate footballers in Saudi Arabia
Tunisian expatriate sportspeople in Switzerland
Tunisian expatriate sportspeople in the United Arab Emirates
Tunisian expatriate sportspeople in Qatar
Tunisian expatriate sportspeople in Bulgaria
Tunisian expatriate sportspeople in Saudi Arabia
UAE First Division League players
Qatar Stars League players
Association football forwards
Tunisia A' international footballers
2011 African Nations Championship players
Tunisian expatriate sportspeople in Bahrain